Kuzminka is a rural locality (a village) in Shingak-Kulsky Selsoviet, Chishminsky District, Bashkortostan, Russia. The population was 108 as of 2010. There are 2 streets.

Geography 
Kuzminka is located 30 km southwest of Chishmy (the district's administrative centre) by road. Shingak-Kul is the nearest rural locality.

References 

Rural localities in Chishminsky District